The 2016 National Assembly for Wales election was held on Thursday 5 May 2016, to elect members (AMs) of the National Assembly for Wales, now known as the Senedd (Welsh Parliament). It was the fifth election for the National Assembly, the third election taken under the rules of the Government of Wales Act 2006 and the first since the Wales Act 2014.

The governing Labour Party's share of the vote fell by over 7% and 29 Labour AMs were elected, one fewer than in 2011 and two short of an overall majority. Plaid Cymru became the Assembly's second largest party and the official opposition to the Welsh Government with 12 seats, one more than before. The 11 Conservative AMs were elected, three fewer than in 2011. Although they did not win a single constituency, the UK Independence Party (UKIP) had 7 members elected through the regional lists vote. The Liberal Democrats had only one AM returned, down from five.

The election was held on the same day as elections for the Scottish Parliament, the Northern Ireland Assembly, the Mayor and Assembly of London and in numerous local authorities in England. The by-election for the Westminster seat of Ogmore was also held on the same day. This election and elections to the other devolved chambers were delayed by a year from 2015 to 2016 as a result of the Fixed-term Parliaments Act 2011. Elections to the Welsh Assembly have now also been permanently moved to a five-year cycle under the Wales Act 2014.

Electoral method
In general elections for the National Assembly for Wales, each voter has two votes in a mixed member system. The first vote is for a candidate to become the Assembly Member for the voter's constituency, elected by the first past the post system. The second vote is for a regional closed party list of candidates. Additional member seats are allocated from the lists by the d'Hondt method, with constituency results being taken into account in the allocation. The overall result is approximately proportional.

Previously it was not allowed to stand in both a constituency and a regional list, but this rule was abolished by the Wales Act 2014. The Act also introduced a ban on dual mandates with the House of Commons: an Assembly Member is no longer allowed also to be an MP.

British, Irish, Commonwealth and European Union citizens living in Wales aged 18 or over on election day were entitled to vote.

Retiring AMs
The following, previously incumbent AMs, did not run for re-election:

Constituency nominations
NB: AMs in office (i.e. incumbents) before the election are bolded. Winners are highlighted with party colours.

Regional lists

Mid and West Wales

North Wales

South Wales Central

South Wales East

South Wales West

Opinion polls

Constituency vote (FPTP)

Regional vote (AMS)

Results

|-
| style="background-color:white" colspan=15 | 
|-
!rowspan=3 colspan=2 | Parties
!colspan=10 | Additional member system
!rowspan=2 colspan=5 | Total seats
|-
!colspan=5 |Constituency
!colspan=5 |Region
|-
! Votes !! % !! +/− !! Seats !! +/− 
! Votes !! % !! +/− !! Seats !! +/−
! Total !! +/− !! %
|-

|}

Votes summary

New members
23 of the members elected to the Assembly in the election were not members of the previous Assembly.

Constituency
 Hannah Blythyn, Labour, Delyn
 Dawn Bowden, Labour, Merthyr Tydfil and Rhymney
 Rhianon Passmore, Labour, Islwyn
 Jayne Bryant, Labour, Newport West
 Vikki Howells, Labour, Cynon Valley
 Jeremy Miles, Labour, Neath
 Hefin David, Labour, Caerphilly
 Lee Waters, Labour, Llanelli
 Huw Irranca-Davies, Labour, Ogmore
 Adam Price, Plaid Cymru, Carmarthen East and Dinefwr
 Siân Gwenllian, Plaid Cymru, Arfon
 Rebecca Evans, Labour, Gower

Regional 
 Nathan Gill, UKIP, North Wales electoral region
 Michelle Brown, UKIP, North Wales electoral region
 Mark Reckless, UKIP, South Wales East electoral region
 David Rowlands, UKIP, South Wales East electoral region
 Steffan Lewis, Plaid Cymru, South Wales East electoral region
 Caroline Jones, UKIP, South Wales West electoral region
 Dai Lloyd, Plaid Cymru, South Wales West electoral region
 Neil Hamilton, UKIP, Mid and West Wales electoral region
 Eluned Morgan, Labour, Mid and West Wales electoral region
 Gareth Bennett, UKIP, South Wales Central electoral region
 Neil McEvoy, Plaid Cymru, South Wales Central electoral region

Constituency and regional summary

Mid and West Wales

|-
! colspan=2 style="width: 200px"|Constituency
! style="width: 150px"|Elected member
! style="width: 300px"|Result
 
 
 
 
 
 
 
 

|-
! colspan="2" style="width: 150px"|Party
! Elected candidates
! style="width: 40px"|Seats
! style="width: 40px"|+/−
! style="width: 50px"|Votes
! style="width: 40px"|%
! style="width: 40px"|+/−%
|-

North Wales

|-
! colspan=2 style="width: 200px"|Constituency
! style="width: 150px"|Elected member
! style="width: 300px"|Result
 
 
 
 
 
 
 
 
 

|-
! colspan="2" style="width: 150px"|Party
! Elected candidates
! style="width: 40px"|Seats
! style="width: 40px"|+/−
! style="width: 50px"|Votes
! style="width: 40px"|%
! style="width: 40px"|+/−%
|-

South Wales Central

|-
! colspan=2 style="width: 200px"|Constituency
! style="width: 150px"|Elected member
! style="width: 300px"|Result
 
 
 
 
 
 
 =
 

|-
! colspan="2" style="width: 150px"|Party
! Elected candidates
! style="width: 40px"|Seats
! style="width: 40px"|+/−
! style="width: 50px"|Votes
! style="width: 40px"|%
! style="width: 40px"|+/−%
|-

South Wales East

|-
! colspan=2 style="width: 200px"|Constituency
! style="width: 150px"|Elected member
! style="width: 300px"|Result
 
 
 
 
 
 
 
 

|-
! colspan="2" style="width: 150px"|Party
! Elected candidates
! style="width: 40px"|Seats
! style="width: 40px"|+/−
! style="width: 50px"|Votes
! style="width: 40px"|%
! style="width: 40px"|+/−%
|-

South Wales West

|-
! colspan=2 style="width: 200px"|Constituency
! style="width: 150px"|Elected member
! style="width: 300px"|Result
 
 
 
 
 
 
 

|-
! colspan="2" style="width: 150px"|Party
! Elected candidates
! style="width: 40px"|Seats
! style="width: 40px"|+/−
! style="width: 50px"|Votes
! style="width: 40px"|%
! style="width: 40px"|+/−%
|-

Aftermath

See also
 Members elected
 2016 Scottish Parliament election
 Northern Ireland Assembly election, 2016
 2016 London mayoral election
 2017 Welsh local elections
 2013 Ynys Môn by-election

Notes

References

External links
 The National Assembly for Wales has produced a website with information on the election.

General elections to the Senedd
2016 elections in the United Kingdom
2016 in Wales
2010s elections in Wales
May 2016 events in the United Kingdom